The Qianlong Emperor  (25 September 17117 February 1799), also known by his temple name Emperor Gaozong of Qing, born Hongli, was the fifth emperor of the Qing dynasty and the fourth Qing emperor to rule over China proper. The fourth son of the Yongzheng Emperor, he reigned officially from 11 October 1735 to 8 February 1796. In 1796, he abdicated in favour of his son, the Jiaqing Emperor, out of filial piety towards his grandfather, the Kangxi Emperor, who ruled for 61 years, so that he not officially usurp him as the longest-reigning emperor. Despite his retirement, however, the Qianlong Emperor retained ultimate power as the Emperor Emeritus until his death in 1799, making him one of the longest-reigning monarchs in history, and dying at the age of 87, one of the longest-lived.

As a capable and cultured ruler inheriting a thriving empire, during his long reign, the Qing Empire reached its most splendid and prosperous era, boasting the largest population and economy in the world. As a military leader, he led military campaigns expanding the dynastic territory to the largest extent by conquering and sometimes destroying Central Asian kingdoms. This turned around in his late years: the Qing empire began to decline with corruption and wastefulness in his court and a stagnating civil society.

Early years

Hongli was the fourth son of the Yongzheng Emperor and was born to Noble Consort Xi. Hongli was adored by both his grandfather, the Kangxi Emperor, and his father, the Yongzheng Emperor. Some historians argue that the main reason why the Kangxi Emperor appointed the Yongzheng Emperor as his successor was because Hongli was his favorite grandson. He felt that Hongli's mannerisms were very similar to his own. As a teenager, Hongli was capable in martial arts and possessed literary ability.

After his father's enthronement in 1722, Hongli was made a qinwang (first-rank prince) under the title "Prince Bao of the First Rank". Like his many uncles, Hongli entered into a battle of succession with his elder half-brother Hongshi, who had the support of a large faction of officials in the imperial court as well as Yunsi, Prince Lian. For many years, the Yongzheng Emperor did not designate any of his sons as the crown prince, but many officials speculated that he favoured Hongli. Hongli went on inspection trips to the south, and was known to be an able negotiator and enforcer. He was also appointed as the chief regent on occasions when his father was away from the capital.

Accession to the throne

Hongli's accession to the throne was already foreseen before he was officially proclaimed emperor before the assembled imperial court upon the death of the Yongzheng Emperor. The young Hongli was the favorite grandson of the Kangxi Emperor and the favorite son of the Yongzheng Emperor; the Yongzheng Emperor had entrusted a number of important ritual tasks to Hongli while the latter was still a prince, and included him in important court discussions of military strategy. In the hope of preventing a succession struggle from occurring, the Yongzheng Emperor wrote the name of his chosen successor on a piece of paper and placed it in a sealed box secured behind the tablet over the throne in the Palace of Heavenly Purity (Qianqing Palace). The name in the box was to be revealed to other members of the imperial family in the presence of all senior ministers only upon the death of the emperor. When the Yongzheng Emperor died suddenly in 1735, the will was taken out and read before the entire Qing imperial court, after which Hongli became the new emperor. Hongli adopted the era name "Qianlong", which means "Lasting Eminence".

A valet who accompanied a British diplomatic mission to the Qing court in 1793 described the emperor:
The Emperor is about five feet ten inches in height, and of a slender but elegant form; his complexion is comparatively fair, though his eyes are dark; his nose is rather aquiline, and the whole of his countenance presents a perfect regularity of feature, which, by no means, announce the great age he is said to have attained; his person is attracting, and his deportment accompanied by an affability, which, without lessening the dignity of the prince, evinces the amiable character of the man. His dress consisted of a loose robe of yellow silk, a cap of black velvet with a red ball on the top, and adorned with a peacock's feather, which is the peculiar distinction of mandarins of the first class. He wore silk boots embroidered with gold, and a sash of blue girded his waist.

Frontier wars

The Qianlong Emperor was a successful military leader. Immediately after ascending the throne, he sent armies to suppress the Miao rebellion. His later campaigns greatly expanded the territory controlled by the Qing Empire. This was made possible not only by Qing military might, but also by the disunity and declining strength of the Inner Asian peoples.

Under the Qianlong Emperor's reign, the Dzungar Khanate was incorporated into the Qing Empire's rule and renamed Xinjiang, while to the west, Ili was conquered and garrisoned. The incorporation of Xinjiang into the Qing Empire resulted from the final defeat and destruction of the Dzungars (or Zunghars), a coalition of Western Mongol tribes. The Qianlong Emperor then ordered the Dzungar genocide. According to the Qing dynasty scholar Wei Yuan, 40% of the 600,000 Dzungars were killed by smallpox, 20% fled to the Russian Empire or Kazakh tribes, and 30% were killed by the Qing army, in what Michael Edmund Clarke described as "the complete destruction of not only the Zunghar state but of the Zunghars as a people." Historian Peter Perdue has argued that the decimation of the Dzungars was the result of an explicit policy of massacre launched by the Qianlong Emperor.

The Dzungar genocide has been compared to the Qing extermination of the Jinchuan Tibetan people in 1776, which also occurred during the Qianlong Emperor's reign. When victorious troops returned to Beijing, a celebratory hymn was sung in their honour. A Manchu version of the hymn was recorded by the Jesuit Amoit and sent to Paris.

The Qing Empire hired Zhao Yi and Jiang Yongzhi at the Military Archives Office, in their capacity as members of the Hanlin Academy, to compile works on the Dzungar campaign, such as Strategy for the pacification of the Dzungars (Pingding Zhunge'er fanglue). Poems glorifying the Qing conquest and genocide of the Dzungar Mongols were written by Zhao, who wrote the Yanpu zaji in "brush-notes" style, where military expenditures of the Qianlong Emperor's reign were recorded. The Qianlong Emperor was praised as being the source of "eighteenth-century peace and prosperity" by Zhao Yi.

Khalkha Mongol rebels under Prince Chingünjav had plotted with the Dzungar leader Amursana and led a rebellion against the Qing Empire around the same time as the Dzungars. The Qing army crushed the rebellion and executed Chingünjav and his entire family.

Throughout this period there were continued Mongol interventions in Tibet and a reciprocal spread of Tibetan Buddhism in Mongolia. After the Lhasa riot of 1750, the Qianlong Emperor sent armies into Tibet and firmly established the Dalai Lama as the ruler of Tibet, with a Qing resident and garrison to preserve Qing presence. Further afield, military campaigns against Nepalese and Gurkhas forced the emperor into stalemate where both parties had to submit.

On 23 January 1751, Tibetan rebels who participated in the Lhasa riot of 1750 against the Qing were sliced to death by Qing Manchu general Bandi, similar to what happened to Tibetan rebels on 1 November 1728 during his father, the Yongzheng Emperor's reign. Six Tibetan rebel leaders plus Tibetan rebel leader Blo-bzan-bkra-sis were sliced to death. The rest of the Tibetan rebel leaders were strangled and beheaded and their heads were displayed to the Tibetan public on poles. The Qing seized the property of the rebels and exiled other Tibetan rebels. Manchu General Bandi sent a report to the Qing Qianlong emperor on 26 January 1751 on how he carried out the slicings and executions of the Tibetan rebels. The Tibetan rebels dBan-rgyas (Wang-chieh), Padma-sku-rje-c'os-a['el (Pa-t'e-ma-ku-erh-chi-ch'un-p'i-lo) and Tarqan Yasor (Ta-erh-han Ya-hsün) were sliced to death for injuring the Manchu ambans with arrows, bows and fowling pieces during the Lhasa riot when they assault the building the Manchu ambans (Labdon and Fucin) were in. Tibetan rebel Sacan Hasiha (Ch'e-ch'en-ha-shih-ha) was sliced to death for murder of multiple individuals. Tibetan rebels Ch'ui-mu-cha-t'e and Rab-brtan (A-la-pu-tan) were sliced to death for looting money and setting fire during the attack on the Ambans. Tibetan rebel Blo-bzan-bkra-sis, the mgron-gner was sliced to death for being the overall leader of the rebels who led the attack which looted money and killed the Manchu ambans. Two Tibetan rebels who had already died before the execution had their dead bodies beheaded, one died in jail, Lag-mgon-po (La-k'o-kun-pu) and the other killed himself since he was scared of the punishment, Pei-lung-sha-k'o-pa. Bandi sentenced to strangulation several rebel followers and bKra-sis-rab-brtan (Cha-shih-la-pu-tan) a messenger. He ordered the live beheadings of Man-chin Te-shih-nai and rDson-dpon dBan-rgyal (Ts'eng-pen Wang-cha-lo and P'yag-mdsod-pa Lha-skyabs (Shang-cho-t'e-pa La-cha-pu) for leading the attack on the building by being the first to go to on the staircase to the next floor and setting fire and carrying the straw to fuel the fire besides killing several men on orders from the rebel leader.

In 1762 the Qianlong Emperor came close to war with the Afghan Emir Ahmad Shah Durrani because of Qing China's expansions in Central Asia. While Qing and Durrani Empire troops were sent near the frontier in Central Asia, war did not break out. A year later, Durrani sent an envoy to Beijing gifting four splendid horses to Qianlong, which became the subject of a series of paintings, Four Afghan Steeds. However, the Afghan envoy failed to make a good impression to Qianlong after refusing to perform the kowtow. Qianlong later refused to intervene in the Durrani Empire's killing of the Sultan of Badakhshan, who was a vassal of Qing China.

The Qianlong Emperor responded to the vassal Shan States's request for military aid against the attacking forces of Burma, but the Sino-Burmese War ended in complete failure. He initially believed that it would be an easy victory against a barbarian tribe, and sent only the Green Standard Army based in Yunnan, which borders Burma. The Qing invasion came as the majority of Burmese forces were deployed in their latest invasion of the Siamese Ayutthaya Kingdom. Nonetheless, battle-hardened Burmese troops defeated the first two invasions of 1765–66 and 1766–67 at the border. The regional conflict now escalated to a major war that involved military manoeuvres nationwide in both countries. The third invasion (1767–1768) led by the elite Manchu Bannermen nearly succeeded, penetrating deep into central Burma within a few days' march from the capital, Inwa. However, the Manchu Bannermen of northern China could not cope with "unfamiliar tropical terrains and lethal endemic diseases", and were driven back with heavy losses. After the close-call, King Hsinbyushin redeployed his armies from Siam to the Chinese front. The fourth and largest invasion got bogged down at the frontier. With the Qing forces completely encircled, a truce was reached between the field commanders of the two sides in December 1769. The Qing forces kept a heavy military lineup in the border areas of Yunnan for about one decade in an attempt to wage another war while imposing a ban on inter-border trade for two decades. When Burma and China resumed a diplomatic relationship in 1790, the Qing government unilaterally viewed the act as Burmese submission, and claimed victory. The Qianlong Emperor ordered Manchu general Eledeng'e (also spelled E'erdeng'e (額爾登額, or possibly 額爾景額)) to be sliced to death after his commander Mingrui was defeated at the Battle of Maymyo in the Sino-Burmese war in 1768 because Eledeng'i was not able to help flank Mingrui when he did not arrive at a rendezvous.

The circumstances in Vietnam were not successful either. In 1787, Lê Chiêu Thống, the last ruler of the Vietnamese Lê dynasty, fled from Vietnam and formally requested to be restored to his throne in Thăng Long (present-day Hanoi). The Qianlong Emperor agreed and sent a large army into Vietnam to remove the Tây Sơn (rebels who had captured all of Vietnam). The capital, Thăng Long, was conquered in 1788, but a few months later the Qing army was defeated, and the invasion turned into a debacle due to the surprise attack during Tết (Vietnamese New Year) by Nguyễn Huệ, the second and most capable of the three Tây Sơn brothers. The Qing Empire no longer supported Lê Chiêu Thống, and his family were imprisoned in Vietnam. The Qing would not intervene in Vietnam for another 90 years.

Despite setbacks in the south, overall the Qianlong Emperor's military expansion nearly doubled the area of the already vast Qing Empire, and unified many non-Han peoples—such as Uyghurs, Kazakhs, Kyrgyzs, Evenks and Mongols. It was also a very expensive enterprise; the funds in the Imperial Treasury were almost all put into military expeditions. Though the wars were successful, they were not overwhelmingly so. The Qing army declined noticeably and had a difficult time facing some enemies: the campaign against the Jinchuan hill peoples took 2 to 3 years—at first the Qing army were mauled, though Yue Zhongqi (a descendant of Yue Fei) later took control of the situation. The battle with the Dzungars was closely fought, and caused heavy losses on both sides.

The Ush rebellion in 1765 by Uyghur Muslims against the Manchus occurred after Uyghur women were gang raped by the servants and son of Manchu official Sucheng. It was said that Ush Muslims had long wanted to sleep on [Sucheng and son's] hides and eat their flesh because of the rape of Uyghur Muslim women for months by the Manchu official Sucheng and his son. The Manchu Qianlong Emperor ordered that the Uyghur rebel town be massacred, the Qing forces enslaved all the Uyghur children and women and slaughtered the Uyghur men. Manchu soldiers and Manchu officials regularly having sex with or raping Uyghur women caused massive hatred and anger against Manchu rule among Uyghur Muslims. The invasion by Jahangir Khoja was preceded by another Manchu official, Binjing, who raped a Muslim daughter of the Kokan aqsaqal from 1818 to 1820. The Qing sought to cover up the rape of Uyghur women by Manchus to prevent anger against their rule from spreading among the Uyghurs.

At the end of the frontier wars, the Qing army had started to weaken significantly. In addition to a more lenient military system, warlords became satisfied with their lifestyles. Since most of the warring had already taken place, warlords no longer saw any reason to train their armies, resulting in a rapid military decline by the end of the Qianlong Emperor's reign. This was the main reason for the Qing military's failure to suppress the White Lotus Rebellion, which started towards the end of the Qianlong Emperor's reign and extended into the reign of the Jiaqing Emperor.

Cultural achievements

 

The Qianlong Emperor, like his predecessors, took his cultural role seriously. First, he worked to preserve the Manchu heritage, which he saw as the basis of the moral character of the Manchus and thus of the dynasty's power. He ordered the compilation of Manchu language genealogies, histories, and ritual handbooks and in 1747 secretly ordered the compilation of the [[Shamanism in the Qing dynasty#The Shamanic Code" of 1747|Shamanic Code]], published later in the Siku Quanshu. He further solidified the dynasty's cultural and religious claims in Central Asia by ordering a replica of the Tibetan Potala Palace, the Putuo Zongcheng Temple, to be built on the grounds of the imperial summer palace in Chengde. In order to present himself to Tibetans and Mongols in Buddhist rather than in Confucian terms, he commissioned a thangka, or sacred painting, depicting him as Manjushri, the Bodhisattva of Wisdom. He was also a poet and essayist. His collected writings, which he published in a tenfold series between 1749 and 1800, contain more than 40,000 poems and 1,300 prose texts, which if he had composed them all would make him one of the most prolific writers of all time.

The Qianlong Emperor was a major patron and important "preserver and restorer" of Confucian culture. He had an insatiable appetite for collecting, and acquired much of China's "great private collections" by any means necessary, and "reintegrated their treasures into the imperial collection." He formed a team of cultural advisers to help locate collections of merchant families who needed to sell or whose heirs had lost interest. He sometimes pressured or forced wealthy officials to surrender precious objects by offering to excuse shortcomings in their performance if they made a certain "gift". On several occasions he claimed that a painting could be secure from theft or fire only if it was taken into the Forbidden City.

The Emperor's massive art collection became an intimate part of his life; he took landscape paintings with him on his travels to compare them with the actual landscapes, or to hang them in special rooms in palaces where he lodged, in order to inscribe them on every visit there. "He also regularly added poetic inscriptions to the paintings of the imperial collection, following the example of the emperors of the Song dynasty and the literati painters of the Ming dynasty. They were a mark of distinction for the work, and a visible sign of his rightful role as emperor. Most particular to the Qianlong Emperor is another type of inscription, revealing a unique practice of dealing with works of art that he seems to have developed for himself. On certain fixed occasions over a long period he contemplated a number of paintings or works of calligraphy which possessed special meaning for him, inscribing each regularly with mostly private notes on the circumstances of enjoying them, using them almost as a diary." In particular, the Qianlong Emperor housed within the Hall of Three Rarities (Sanxitang), a small chamber within the Hall of Mental Cultivation, three calligraphy works: "Timely Clearing After Snowfall" by Wang Xizhi, from the Jin dynasty, "Mid-Autumn" by his son Wang Xianzhi, and "Letter to Boyuan" by Wang Xun.

Most of the several thousand jade items in the imperial collection date from his reign. The Emperor was also particularly interested in collecting ancient bronzes, bronze mirrors and seals," in addition to pottery, [ceramics and applied arts such as enameling, metal work and lacquer work, which flourished during his reign; a substantial part of his collection is in the Percival David Foundation in London. The Victoria and Albert Museum and British Museum also have collections of art from the Qianlong era.

One of his grandest projects was to assemble a team of scholars to assemble, edit, and print the largest collection ever made of Chinese philosophy, history, and literature. Known as the Four Treasuries Project (or Siku Quanshu), it was published in 36,000 volumes, containing about 3,450 complete works and employing as many as 15,000 copyists. It preserved numerous books, but was also intended as a way to ferret out and suppress political opponents, requiring the "careful examination of private libraries to assemble a list of around eleven thousand works from the past, of which about a third were chosen for publication. The works not included were either summarised or—in a good many cases—scheduled for destruction."

Burning of books and modification of texts

Some 2,300 works were listed for total suppression and another 350 for partial suppression. The aim was to destroy the writings that were anti-Qing or rebellious, that insulted previous "barbarian" dynasties, or that dealt with frontier or defence problems. The full editing of the Siku Quanshu was completed in about ten years; during these ten years, 3,100 titles (or works), about 150,000 copies of books were either burnt or banned. Of those volumes that had been categorised into the Siku Quanshu, many were subjected to deletion and modification. Books published during the Ming dynasty suffered the greatest damage.

The authority would judge any single character or any single sentence's neutrality; if the authority had decided these words, or sentence, were derogatory or cynical towards the rulers, then persecution would begin. In the Qianlong Emperor's time, there were 53 cases of Literary Inquisition, resulting in the victims executed by beheading or slow slicing (lingchi), or having their corpses mutilated (if they were already dead).

Literary works
In 1743, after his first visit to Mukden (present-day Shenyang, Liaoning), the Qianlong Emperor used Chinese to write his "Ode to Mukden", (Shengjing fu/Mukden-i fujurun bithe), a fu in classical style, as a poem of praise to Mukden, at that point a general term for what was later called Manchuria, describing its beauties and historical values. He describes the mountains and wildlife, using them to justify his belief that the dynasty would endure. A Manchu translation was then made. In 1748, he ordered a jubilee printing in both Chinese and Manchu, using some genuine pre-Qin forms and Manchu styles which had to be invented and which could not be read.

Languages
In his childhood, the Qianlong Emperor was tutored in Manchu, Chinese and Mongolian, arranged to be tutored in Tibetan, and spoke Chagatai (Turki or Modern Uyghur). However, he was even more concerned than his predecessors to preserve and promote the Manchu language among his followers, as he proclaimed that "the keystone for Manchus is language." He commissioned new Manchu dictionaries, and directed the preparation of the Pentaglot Dictionary which gave equivalents for Manchu terms in Mongolian, Tibetan and Turkic, and had the Buddhist canon translated into Manchu, which was considered the "national language". He directed the elimination of loanwords taken from Chinese and replaced them with calque translations which were put into new Manchu dictionaries. Manchu translations of Chinese works during his reign were direct translations contrasted with Manchu books translated during the Kangxi Emperor's reign which were transliterations in Manchu script of the Chinese characters.

The Qianlong Emperor commissioned the Qin ding Xiyu Tongwen Zhi (欽定西域同文志; "Imperial Western Regions Thesaurus") which was a thesaurus of geographic names in Xinjiang, in Oirat Mongol, Manchu, Chinese, Tibetan, and Turki (Modern Uyghur).

Tibetan Buddhism

The Qianlong Emperor showed a personal belief in Tibetan Buddhism, following the tradition of Manchu rulers associating with the Bodhisattva Manjushri. He continued their patronage of Tibetan Buddhist art and ordered translations of the Buddhist canon into Manchu. Court records and Tibetan language sources affirm his personal commitment. He learned to read Tibetan and studied Buddhist texts assiduously. His beliefs are reflected in the Tibetan Buddhist imagery of his tomb, perhaps the most personal and private expression of an emperor's life. He supported the Yellow Church (the Tibetan Buddhist Gelug sect) to "maintain peace among the Mongols" since the Mongols were followers of the Dalai Lama and Panchen Lama of the Yellow Church. He also said it was "merely in pursuance of Our policy of extending Our affection to the weak" which led him to patronize the Yellow Church.

In 1744 he turned the Palace of Harmony (Yonghe Palace) into a Tibetan Buddhist temple for Mongols.  To explain the practical reasons for supporting the "Yellow Hats" Tibetan Buddhists and to deflect Han Chinese criticism, he had the "Lama Shuo" stele engraved in Tibetan, Mongol, Manchu and Chinese, which said: "By patronizing the Yellow Church, we maintain peace among the Mongols. This being an important task we cannot but protect this (religion). (In doing so) we do not show any bias, nor do we wish to adulate the Tibetan priests (as it was done during the Yuan dynasty)."Berger 2003, p. 35.

Mark Elliott concludes that these actions delivered political benefits but "meshed seamlessly with his personal faith."

Anti-Islam laws

Qing policy on Muslims and Islam was changed during the reign of the Kangxi, Yongzheng and Qianlong Emperors. While the Kangxi Emperor proclaimed Muslims and Han to be equal, his grandson, the Qianlong Emperor, endorsed Han officials harsh recommendations towards treatment of Muslims. The Kangxi Emperor said that Muslim and Han Chinese were equal when people argued for Muslims to be treated differently. The Yongzheng Emperor held the opinion that "Islam was foolish, but he felt it did not pose a threat" when a judge in Shandong petitioned him to destroy mosques and ban Islam. Yongzheng then fired an official for demanding Muslims be punished more harshly than non-Muslims.

This policy changed in the reign of the Qianlong Emperor. Chen Hongmou, a Qing official, said that Muslims needed to be brought to law and order by being punished more harshly and blaming Muslim leaders for criminal behavior of Muslims in a letter to the Board of Punishments called Covenant to Instruct and Admonish Muslims that he wrote in 1751. Although the Board of Punishment did nothing, the Shaanxi-Gansu Governor-General in 1762 then proceeded to implement his recommendation and had Muslim criminals punished severely more than Han Chinese ones. He also implemented the policy that the criminal deeds of Muslim congregants of Mosques ended up with their Imams being punished and held responsible for them. These anti-Muslim policies by the governor general received endorsement from the Qianlong Emperor.Great changes happening to Chinese Muslims, like the introduction of a Sufi order, the Naqshbandiyya to the Hui, causing the Qianlong emperor to adopt this harsh attitude against Muslims in contrast to his grandfather and father. This led to larger connections between the Hui and the broader Islamic world from the west, as the Naqshbandiyya order came east to the Hui when Hui scholars in Suzhou were converted to Naqshbandiyya by Muhammad Yusuf Khoja. Afaq Khoja, Muhammad Yusuf's son, also further spread Naqshbandi orders among Chinese Muslims like Tibetan Muslims, Salars, Hui and other Muslim ethnicities in Hezhou, Gansu (now Linxia) and Xining in Qinghai and Lanzhou. Ma Laichi was the leader of one of these orders and he personally studied in the Islamic world in Bukhara to learn Sufism, and Yemen and in Mecca where he was taught by Mawlana Makhdum. This brought him prestige among Chinese Muslims. In an argument over the breaking of fast during Ramadan Ma Laichi said that before praying in the mosque, fast should be broken, not vice versa and this led to him getting many Naqshbandi converts from Hui and Turkic Salars. It came to court in 1731 when the Muslims arguing over how to break Ramadan fast filed lawsuits. The Muslim plaintiffs were told by the Qing authorities at the court to resolve them themselves, as the legal authorities who had no idea about Ramadan fasting. The dispute was not solved and continued to go on and was compounded by even more disputes like how to perform dhikr in Sufism, in a jahri (vocal) as taught by Ma Mingxin, another Sufi who learned in the western Islamic lands like Bukhara, or khufi (silent) like what Ma Laichi did. The Zabid Naqshbandiyyas in Yemen taught Ma Mingxin for two decades. They taught vocal dhikr. Ma Mingxin was also affected by another series of events in the Middle Eastern Muslim world, revivalist movements among Muslims like the Saudis who allied with Muhammad ibn 'Abd al-Wahhab. This renewal tajdid influenced Ma Mingxin in Yemen.

While Ma Mingxin was in Yemen and away from China, all of Muslim Inner Asia was conquered by the "infidel" Qing dynasty giving even more relevance to his situation and views. Ma Laichi and Ma Mingxin again sued each other in court but this second time the Qing passed a verdict in favor of the quiet dhikr faction, the Silentist Khafiyya of Ma Laichi and gave it the status of orthodoxy while damning as heterodox the Aloudist Jahriyya of Ma Mingxin. Ma Mingxin ignored the order and kept proselytizing in Shaanxi, Ningxia and Xinjiang going to Guangchuan from Hezhou in 1769 after being kicked out and banned from Xunhua district. Turkic Salars in Xunhua followed his orders even after the Qing banned him from there and he continued to have further lawsuits and legal issues with the Khafiyya and Ma Laichi as the Qing backed the Khafiyya.

A violent battle where a Qing official and Khafiyya followers were among one hundred slaughtered by a Jahriyya assault headed by Su Forty-three, a supporter of Ma Mingxin in 1781 led to Ma Mingxin declared a rebel and taken to jail in Lanzhou. The Qing executed Ma Mingxin after his release was demanded by the armed followers of Su Forty-three. A Jahriyya rebellion all over northwest China ensued after Ma Mingxin was executed. In response, the Manchus in Beijing sent Manchu Grand Secretary Agui with a battalion to slaughter Jahriyya chiefs and exile the adherents of the Sufi order to the border regions.

Tian Wu led another Jahriyya rebellion 3 years after that, which was crushed by the Qing, and the Ma Datian, the Jahriyya's 3rd leader was exiled to Manchuria in 1818 by the Qing and died.

This continual build up of conflict between Muslims and the Qing court led to the 19th century full-scale wars with Muslim rebellions against the Qing in southern and northern China. The change in Manchu attitudes towards Muslims, from tolerating Muslims and regarding them as equal to Han Chinese, before the 1760s, to the violence between the Qing state and Muslims after the 1760s, was due to progressive Qing involvement in the conflict between the Sufi orders Jahriyya and Khafiyya making it no longer possible for the Qing to keep up with the early rhetoric of Muslim equality. The Manchu court under Qianlong began approving and implementing Chen Hongmou's anti-Muslim laws that targeted Muslims for practicing their religion and the violence by the Qing state, the communal violence between Jahriyya and Khafiyya coincided with the Jahriyya's major expansion.

Chen Hongmou's policies were implemented as laws in 1762 by the Qing government's Board of Punishments and the Qing Manchu Qianlong emperor leading to severe tensions with Muslims. State authorities were mandated to receive all reports of Muslim criminal behaviour by local officials and all criminal behaviour by Muslims had to be reported by Muslim leaders to Qing authorities under these laws. This led to an inundation of anti-Muslim reports filing in Qing offices as the Qing court received information that Muslims were inherently violent and Muslim bandits were committing crimes as report after report were filed by local officials and Muslim crimes inundated court records. The Qing became even more anti-Muslim after receiving these reports about criminal behavior and started passing even more anti-Muslim laws one of them being that if any weapon was found in a group of 3 or more Muslims all of those Muslims would by sentenced as criminals by the Qing.

A new criminal category or act, brawling (dou'ou) was designated by the Qing Manchu court of the Manchu Qianlong emperor in the 1770s especially as an anti-Muslim measure to arrest Muslims leading to even non-Jahriyya Muslims to join with Jahriyya against the Qing and leading the Qing court to be even more anti-Muslim, apprehensive of anti-Qing rebellion by Muslims. This led to the execution of Ma Mingxin in 1781 and the rebellion and violence was compounded by lack of Qing intelligence. A Qing official who was tasked with ending the Jahriyya and Khafiyya communal violence mistakenly thought the people he were talking to were Khafiyya when they were in fact Jahriyya, and he told them that the Qing would massacre all Jahriyya adherents. This led to him being murdered by the Jahriyya mob, which led to the Qing sending Manchu Grand Secretary Agui on a full scale pacification crackdown campaign against the Jahriyya.

The military victory of the Qing against the Jahriyya led to even more Jahriyya anger. Officials went overboard in massacring Muslims deemed as state enemies to impress the Qing court, leading to further growth in Jahriyya membership, leading in turn to the 1784 rebellion by Tian Wu.

The Qianlong Emperor asked his minister what was going on as he was puzzled as to how the Muslims from many regions gathered together for revolt. He asked if the investigation of Muslim behavior by Li Shiyao got leaked leading to rebels to incite violence by telling Muslims the government would exterminate them. He then pondered and said none of these could be why and kept asking why. To solve the issue of the 1784 revolt, northwestern China was put under military occupation by the Qing for 50 years until the Taiping rebellion of southern China forced the Qing to move them away from northwest China leading to the massive 1860s and 1870s Muslim revolts in the northwest caused by growing violence.

The sudden questions about halal in Islam that Mongol Buddhists had in the 18th century was caused by all these things, northwestern China right next to Mongolia getting militarized, the Qing government officially declaring Muslims to be anti-Qing and violent and revivalist Islam coming to China.

Christianity
The persecution of Christians by Yongzheng became even worse during the Qianlong reign.

Palaces

The Qianlong Emperor was an aggressive builder. In the hills northwest of Beijing, he expanded the villa known as the Garden of Perfect Brightness (or Yuanmingyuan; now known as the Old Summer Palace) originally built by his father. He eventually added two new villas, the "Garden of Eternal Spring" and the "Elegant Spring Garden". In time, the Old Summer Palace would encompass , five times larger than the Forbidden City. To celebrate the 60th birthday of his mother, Empress Dowager Chongqing, the Qianlong Emperor ordered a lake at the Garden of Clear Ripples (or Qingyiyuan; now known as the Summer Palace) dredged, named it Kunming Lake, and renovated a villa on the eastern shore of the lake.

The Qianlong Emperor also expanded the imperial summer palace in Rehe Province, beyond the Great Wall. Rehe eventually became effectively a third capital and it was at Rehe that the Qianlong Emperor held court with various Mongol nobles. The emperor also spent time at the Mulan hunting grounds north of Rehe, where he held the imperial hunt each year.

European styles
For the Old Summer Palace, the Qianlong Emperor commissioned the Italian Jesuit Giuseppe Castiglione for the construction of the Xiyang Lou, or Western-style mansion, to satisfy his taste for exotic buildings and objects. He also commissioned the French Jesuit Michel Benoist, to design a series of timed waterworks and fountains complete with underground machinery and pipes, for the amusement of the imperial family. The French Jesuit Jean Denis Attiret also became a painter for the emperor. Jean-Damascène Sallusti was also a court painter. He co-designed, with Castiglione and Ignatius Sichelbart, the Battle Copper Prints.

Other architecture
During the Qianlong Emperor's reign, the Emin Minaret was built in Turpan to commemorate Emin Khoja, a Uyghur leader from Turpan who submitted to the Qing Empire as a vassal in order to obtain assistance from the Qing to fight the Dzunghars.

Descendants of the Ming dynasty's imperial family
In 1725, the Yongzheng Emperor bestowed an hereditary marquis title on a descendant of Zhu Zhilian, a descendant of the imperial family of the Ming dynasty. Zhu was also paid by the Qing government to perform rituals at the Ming tombs and induct the Chinese Plain White Banner into the Eight Banners. Zhu was posthumously awarded the title "Marquis of Extended Grace" in 1750, and the title was passed on for 12 generations in his family until the end of the Qing dynasty. However, it has been argued that Zhu Zhilian, in fact, had no relation to the imperial family at all.

Banner system

The Qianlong Emperor instituted a policy of "Manchu-fying" the Eight Banner system, which was the basic military and social organisation of the dynasty. In the early Qing era, Nurhaci and Hong Taiji categorised Manchu and Han ethnic identity within the Eight Banners based on culture, lifestyle and language, instead of ancestry or genealogy. Han Bannermen were an important part of the Banner System. The Qianlong Emperor changed this definition to one of descent, and demobilised many Han Bannermen and urged Manchu Bannermen to protect their cultural heritage, language and martial skills. The emperor redefined the identity of Han Bannermen by saying that they were to be regarded as of having the same culture and being of the same ancestral extraction as Han civilians Conversely, he emphasised the martial side of Manchu culture and reinstituted the practice of the annual imperial hunt as begun by his grandfather, leading contingents from the Manchu and Mongol banners to the Mulan hunting grounds each autumn to test and improve their skills.

The Qianlong Emperor's view of the Han Bannermen also differed from that of his grandfather in deciding that loyalty in itself was most important quality. He sponsored biographies which depicted Chinese Bannermen who defected from the Ming to the Qing as traitors and glorifying Ming loyalists. Some of the Qianlong Emperor's inclusions and omissions on the list of traitors were political in nature. Some of these actions were including Li Yongfang (out of his dislike for Li Yongfang's descendant, Li Shiyao) and excluding Ma Mingpei (out of concern for his son Ma Xiongzhen's image).

The identification and interchangeability between "Manchu" and "Banner people" (Qiren) began in the 17th century. Banner people were differentiated from civilians (Chinese: Minren, Manchu: Irgen; or Chinese: Hanren, Manchu: Nikan) and the term "Bannermen" was becoming identical with "Manchu" in the general perception. The Qianlong Emperor referred to all Bannermen as Manchu, and Qing laws did not say "Manchu", but "Bannermen".

Select groups of Han Chinese bannermen were mass transferred into Manchu Banners by the Qing, changing their ethnicity from Han Chinese to Manchu. Han Chinese bannermen of Tai Nikan (台尼堪) and Fusi Nikan (抚顺尼堪) backgrounds were moved into the Manchu banners in 1740 by order of the Qianlong Emperor. It was between 1618 and 1629 when the Han Chinese from Liaodong who later became the Fusi Nikan and Tai Nikan defected to the Jurchens (Manchus). These Han Chinese origin Manchu clans continued to use their original Han surnames and are marked as of Han origin on the Qing lists of Manchu clans.

Anti-gun measures
The Solons were ordered by the Qianlong Emperor to stop using rifles and instead practice traditional archery. The emperor issued an edict for silver taels to be issued for guns turned over to the government.

Chinese political identity and frontier policy
The Qianlong Emperor and his predecessors, since the Shunzhi Emperor, had identified China and the Qing Empire as the same, and in treaties and diplomatic papers the Qing Empire called itself "China". The Qianlong Emperor rejected earlier ideas that only Han could be subjects of China and only Han land could be considered as part of China, so he redefined China as multiethnic, saying in 1755 that "there exists a view of China according to which non-Han people cannot become China's subjects and their land cannot be integrated into the territory of China. This does not represent our dynasty's understanding of China, but is instead that of the earlier Han, Tang, Song, and Ming dynasties."

The Qianlong Emperor rejected the views of Han officials who said Xinjiang was not part of China and that he should not conquer it, putting forth the view that China was multiethnic and did not just refer to Han. The Qianlong Emperor compared his achievements with that of the Han and Tang ventures into Central Asia.

Han settlement
Han Chinese farmers were resettled from north China by the Qing government in the area along the Liao River in order to restore the land to cultivation. Wasteland was reclaimed by Han squatters in addition to other Han people who rented land from Manchu landlords. Despite officially prohibiting Han settlement on the Manchu and Mongol lands, by the 18th century the Qing government decided to settle Han refugees from northern China who were suffering from famine, floods, and drought into Manchuria and Inner Mongolia. Due to this, Han people farmed 500,000 hectares in Manchuria and tens of thousands of hectares in Inner Mongolia by the 1780s. The Qianlong Emperor allowed Han peasants suffering from drought to move into Manchuria despite him issuing edicts in favor of banning them from 1740 to 1776. Han tenant farmers rented or even claimed title to land from the "imperial estates" and Manchu Bannerlands in the area. Besides moving into the Liao area in southern Manchuria, the path linking Jinzhou, Fengtian, Tieling, Changchun, Hulun, and Ningguta was settled by Han people during the Qianlong Emperor's reign, and Han people were the majority in urban areas of Manchuria by 1800. To increase the Imperial Treasury's revenue, the Qing government sold lands along the Songhua River which were previously exclusively for Manchus to Han Chinese at the beginning of the Daoguang Emperor's reign, and Han people filled up most of Manchuria's towns by the 1840s, according to Évariste Régis Huc.

Later years

In his later years, the Qianlong Emperor became spoiled with power and glory, disillusioned and complacent in his reign, and started placing his trust in corrupt officials such as Yu Minzhong and Heshen.

As Heshen was the highest ranked minister and most favoured by the Qianlong Emperor at the time, the day-to-day governance of the country was left in his hands, while the emperor himself indulged in the arts, luxuries and literature. When Heshen was executed by the Jiaqing Emperor, the Qing government discovered that Heshen's personal fortune exceeded that of the Qing Empire's depleted treasury, amounting to 900 million silver taels, the total of 12 years of Treasury surplus of the Qing imperial court.

The Qianlong Emperor began his reign with about 33.95 million silver taels in Treasury surplus. At the peak of his reign, even with further tax cuts, the treasury surplus still reached 73.9 million silver taels, a record unmatched by his predecessors, the Kangxi and Yongzheng emperors, both of whom had implemented remarkable tax cut policies.

However, due to numerous factors such as long term embezzlement and corruption by officials, frequent expeditions to the south, huge palace constructions, many war and rebellion campaigns as well as his own extravagant lifestyle, all of these cost the treasury a total of 150.2 million silver taels. This, coupled with his senior age and the lack of political reforms, ushered the beginning of the gradual decline and eventual demise of the Qing Empire, casting a shadow over his glorious and brilliant political life.

Macartney Embassy

Legal trade in the South China Sea was resumed in 1727, but the East India Company's discovery that the prices and duties at Ningbo were both much lower than those at Guangzhou prompted them to begin shifting their trade north from 1755 to 1757. The Qianlong Emperor's attempt to discourage this through higher fees failed; in the winter of 1757, he declared that—effective the next year—Guangzhou (then romanized as "Canton") was to be the only Chinese port permitted to foreign traders, beginning the Canton System, with its Cohong and Thirteen Factories.

During the mid-18th century, European powers began to pressure for increases in the already burgeoning foreign trade and for outposts on the Chinese coast, demands which the aging Qianlong emperor resisted. In 1793 King George III sent a large-scale delegation to present their requests directly to the emperor in Beijing, headed by George Macartney, one of the country's most seasoned diplomats. The British sent a sample of trade goods that they intended to sell in China; this was misinterpreted as tribute that was adjudged to be of low quality.

Historians both in China and abroad long presented the failure of the mission to achieve its goals as a symbol of China's refusal to change and inability to modernize. They explain the refusal first on the fact that interaction with foreign kingdoms was limited to neighbouring tributary states. Furthermore, the worldviews on the two sides were incompatible, China holding entrenched beliefs that China was the "central kingdom". However, after the publication in the 1990s of a fuller range of archival documents concerning the visit, these claims have been challenged. One historian characterized the emperor and his court as "clearly clever and competent political operators", and concluded that they acted within the formal Qing claims to universal rule; they reacted prudently to reports of British expansion in India by placating the British with unspecified promises in order to avoid military conflicts and loss of trade.

Macartney was granted an audience with the Qianlong Emperor on two days, the second of which coincided with the emperor's 82nd birthday. There is continued debate about the nature of the audience and what level of ceremonials were performed. Macartney wrote that he resisted demands that the British trade ambassadors kneel and perform the kowtow and debate continues as to what exactly occurred, differing opinions recorded by Qing courtiers and British delegates.

Qianlong gave Macartney a letter for the British king stating the reasons that he would not grant Macartney's requests:

Yesterday your Ambassador petitioned my Ministers to memorialise me regarding your trade with China, but his proposal is not consistent with our dynastic usage and cannot be entertained. Hitherto, all European nations, including your own country's barbarian merchants, have carried on their trade with our Celestial Empire at Canton. Such has been the procedure for many years, although our Celestial Empire possesses all things in prolific abundance and lacks no product within its own borders.

Your request for a small island near Chusan, where your merchants may reside and goods be warehoused, arises from your desire to develop trade... Consider, moreover, that England is not the only barbarian land which wishes to establish... trade with our Empire: supposing that other nations were all to imitate your evil example and beseech me to present them each and all with a site for trading purposes, how could I possibly comply? This also is a flagrant infringement of the usage of my Empire and cannot possibly be entertained.

Hitherto, the barbarian merchants of Europe have had a definite locality assigned to them at Aomen for residence and trade, and have been forbidden to encroach an inch beyond the limits assigned to that locality.... If these restrictions were withdrawn, friction would inevitably occur between the Chinese and your barbarian subjects...

Regarding your nation's worship of the Lord of Heaven, it is the same religion as that of other European nations. Ever since the beginning of history, sage Emperors and wise rulers have bestowed on China a moral system and inculcated a code, which from time immemorial has been religiously observed by the myriads of my subjects. There has been no hankering after heterodox doctrines. Even the European (missionary) officials in my capital are forbidden to hold intercourse with Chinese subjects...

The letter was unknown to the public until 1914, when it was translated, then later used as a symbol of China's refusal to modernize.

Macartney's conclusions in his memoirs were widely quoted:

The Empire of China is an old, crazy, first-rate Man of War, which a fortunate succession of able and vigilant officers have contrived to keep afloat for these hundred and fifty years past, and to overawe their neighbours merely by her bulk and appearance. But whenever an insufficient man happens to have the command on deck, adieu to the discipline and safety of the ship. She may, perhaps, not sink outright; she may drift some time as a wreck, and will then be dashed to pieces on the shore; but she can never be rebuilt on the old bottom.

Titsingh Embassy
A Dutch embassy arrived at the Qianlong Emperor's court in 1795, which would turn out to be the last time any European appeared before the Qing imperial court within the context of traditional Chinese imperial foreign relations.

Representing Dutch and Dutch East India Company interests, Isaac Titsingh traveled to Beijing in 1794–95 for celebrations of the 60th anniversary of the Qianlong Emperor's reign. The Titsingh delegation also included the Dutch-American Andreas Everardus van Braam Houckgeest, whose detailed description of this embassy to the Qing court was soon after published in the United States and Europe. Titsingh's French translator, Chrétien-Louis-Joseph de Guignes, published his own account of the Titsingh mission in 1808. Voyage a Pékin, Manille et l'Ile de France provided an alternate perspective and a useful counterpoint to other reports that were then circulating. Titsingh himself died before he could publish his version of events.

In contrast to Macartney, Isaac Titsingh, the Dutch and VOC emissary in 1795 did not refuse to kowtow. In the year following Mccartney's rebuff, Titsingh and his colleagues were much feted by the Chinese because of what was construed as seemly compliance with conventional court etiquette.

Abdication
In October 1795, the Qianlong Emperor officially announced that in the spring of the following year he would voluntarily abdicate and pass the throne to his son. It was said that the Qianlong Emperor had made a promise during the year of his ascension not to rule longer than his grandfather, the Kangxi Emperor, who had reigned for 61 years. The Qianlong Emperor anticipated moving out of the Hall of Mental Cultivation (Yangxindian) in the Forbidden City. The hall had been conventionally dedicated for the exclusive use of the reigning sovereign, and in 1771 the emperor ordered the beginning of construction on what was ostensibly intended as his retirement residence in another part of the Forbidden City: a lavish, two-acre walled retreat called the Palace of Tranquil Longevity (Ningshou Palace), which is today more commonly known as the "Qianlong Garden". The complex, completed in 1776, is currently undergoing a ten-year restoration led by the Palace Museum in Beijing and the World Monuments Fund (WMF). The first of the restored apartments, the Qianlong Emperor's Studio of Exhaustion From Diligent Service (Juanqinzhai) began an exhibition tour of the United States in 2010.

The Qianlong Emperor relinquished the throne at the age of 85, after almost 61 years on the throne, to his son, the 36-year-old Jiaqing Emperor, in 1796. For the next three years, he held the title Taishang Huang (or Emperor Emeritus; 太上皇) even though he continued to hold on to power and the Jiaqing Emperor ruled only in name. He never moved into his retirement suites in the Qianlong Garden and died in 1799.

Legends

A legend, popularised in fiction, says that the Qianlong Emperor was the son of Chen Shiguan (陳世倌), a Han Chinese official from Haining County, Zhejiang Province. In his choice of heir to the throne, the Kangxi Emperor required not only that the heir be able to govern the empire well, but heir's son be of no less calibre; thus, ensuring the Manchus' everlasting reign over China. Yinzhen's son, the Kangxi Emperor's fourth son, was weak; so, Yinzhen surreptitiously arranged for his daughter to be exchanged for Chen Shiguan's son, who became the favourite grandson of the Kangxi Emperor. Yinzhen succeeded his father, becoming the Yongzheng Emperor while his son, Hongli, succeeded him in turn as the Qianlong Emperor. During his reign, the Qianlong Emperor went on inspection tours to southern China and stayed in Chen Shiguan's house in Haining where he wrote calligraphy. He also frequently issued imperial edicts to waive off taxes from Haining County.

However, there are major problems with this story. First, the Yongzheng Emperor's eldest surviving son, Hongshi, was only seven when Hongli was born, far too young to make the drastic choice of replacing a child of imperial birth with an outsider (and risking disgrace if not death). Second, the Yongzheng Emperor had three other princes who survived to adulthood and had the potential to ascend the throne. Indeed, since Hongshi was the son forced to commit suicide, it would have been far more logical for him to be the adopted son, if any of them were.

Stories about the Qianlong Emperor's six inspection tours to southern China in disguise as a commoner have been a popular topic for many generations. In total, he visited southern China six times – the same number of times as his grandfather, the Kangxi Emperor.

 Family 
Empress

 Empress Xiaoxianchun (孝賢純皇后) of the Fuca clan (富察氏) (28 March 1712 – 8 April 1748)Titles: Primary Consort (嫡福晋) → Empress (皇后) → Empress Xiaoxian (孝賢皇后) → Empress Xiaoxianchun (孝賢純皇后)
 1st daughter (3 November 1728 – 14 February 1730)
 Yonglian, Crown Prince Duanhui (端慧皇太子 永璉; 9 August 1730 – 23 November 1738), 2nd son
 Princess Hejing of the First Rank (固倫和敬公主; 31 July 1731 – 30 September 1792), 3rd daughter
Married Septeng Baljur (色布騰巴爾珠爾; d. 1775) of the Mongol Khorchin Borjigin clan in April/May 1747, and had issue (one son, four daughters).
 Yongcong, Prince Zhe of the First Rank (哲親王 永琮; 27 May 1746 – 29 January 1748), 7th son
 Empress (皇后) of the Nara clan (那拉氏) (11 March 1718 – 19 August 1766)Titles: Secondary Consort (側福晉) → Consort Xian (嫻妃) → Noble Consort Xian (嫻貴妃) → Imperial Noble Consort (皇貴妃) → Empress (皇后)
 Yongji, Prince of the Third Rank (貝勒 永璂; 7 June 1752 – 17 March 1776), 12th son
 5th daughter (23 July 1753 – 1 June 1755)
 Yongjing (永璟; 22 January 1756 – 7 September 1757), 13th son
Empress Xiaoyichun (孝儀純皇后) of the Weigiya clan (魏佳氏) (23 October 1727 – 28 February 1775)Titles: Noble Lady (貴人) → Concubine Ling (令嬪) → Consort Ling (令妃) → Noble Consort Ling (令貴妃) → Imperial Noble Consort (皇貴妃) → Imperial Noble Consort Lingyi (令懿皇貴妃) → Empress Xiaoyi (孝儀皇后) → Empress Xiaoyichun (孝儀純皇后)
 Princess Hejing of the First Rank (固倫和靜公主; 10 August 1756 – 9 February 1775), 7th daughter
 Married Lhawang Dorji (拉旺多爾濟; 1754–1816) of the Mongol Khalkha Borjigin clan in August/September 1770.
 Yonglu (永璐; 31 August 1757 – 3 May 1760), 14th son
 Princess Heke of the Second Rank (和碩和恪公主; 17 August 1758 – 14 December 1780), 9th daughter
 Married Jalantai (|札蘭泰; d. 1788) of the Manchu Uya clan in August/September 1772 and had issue (one daughter).
 Miscarriage at eight months (13 November 1759)
 Yongyan (顒琰; 13 November 1760 – 2 September 1820), the Jiaqing Emperor (嘉慶帝), 15th son
 16th son (13 January 1763 – 6 May 1765) 
 Yonglin, Prince Qingxi of the First Rank (慶僖親王 永璘; 17 June 1766 – 25 April 1820), 17th son

Imperial Noble Consort

Imperial Noble Consort Huixian (慧賢皇貴妃) of the Gaogiya clan (高佳氏) (1711 – 25 February 1745)Titles: Mistress (格格) → Secondary Consort (側福晉) → Noble Consort (貴妃) → Imperial Noble Consort (皇貴妃) → Imperial Noble Consort Huixian (慧賢皇貴妃)
Imperial Noble Consort Zhemin (哲憫皇貴妃) of the Fuca clan (富察氏) (d. 20 August 1735)Titles: Mistress (格格) → Consort Zhe (哲妃) → Imperial Noble Consort (皇貴妃) → Imperial Noble Consort Zhemin (哲憫皇貴妃)
 Yonghuang, Prince Ding'an of the First Rank (定安親王 永璜; 5 July 1728 – 21 April 1750), 1st son
 2nd daughter (1 June 1731 – 6 January 1732)
Imperial Noble Consort Shujia (淑嘉皇貴妃) of the Gingiya clan (金佳氏) (14 September 1713 – 17 December 1755)Titles: Mistress (格格) → Noble Lady (貴人) → Concubine Jia (嘉嬪) → Consort Jia (嘉妃) → Noble Consort Jia (嘉貴妃) → Imperial Noble Consort (皇貴妃) → Imperial Noble Consort Shujia (淑嘉皇貴妃)
 Yongcheng, Prince Lüduan of the First Rank (履端親王 永珹; 21 February 1739 – 5 April 1777), 4th son
 Yongxuan, Prince Yishen of the First Rank (儀慎親王 永璇; 31 August 1746 – 1 September 1832), 8th son
 Yongyu (永瑜; 2 August 1748 – 11 June 1749), 9th son Yongxing, Prince Chengzhe of the First Rank (成哲親王 永瑆; 22 March 1752 – 10 May 1823), 11th son
 Imperial Noble Consort Chunhui (純惠皇貴妃) of the Su clan (蘇氏) (13 June 1713 – 2 June 1760)Titles: Mistress (格格) → Concubine Chun (純嬪) → Consort Chun (純妃) → Noble Consort Chun (純貴妃) → Imperial Noble Consort (皇貴妃) → Imperial Noble Consort Chunhui (純惠皇貴妃)
 Yongzhang, Prince Xun of the Second Rank (循郡王 永璋; 15 July 1735 – 26 August 1760), 3rd son
 Yongrong, Prince Zhizhuang of the First Rank (質莊親王 永瑢; 28 January 1744 – 13 June 1790), 6th son
 Princess Hejia of the Second Rank (和碩和嘉公主; 24 December 1745 – 29 October 1767), 4th daughter
 Married Fulong'an (福隆安; 1746–1784) of the Manchu Fuca clan on 10 May 1760, and had issue (one son).
 Imperial Noble Consort Qinggong (慶恭皇貴妃) of the Lu clan (陸氏) (12 August 1724 – 21 August 1774)Titles: First Attendant (常在) → Noble Lady (貴人) → Concubine Qing (慶嬪) → Consort Qing (慶妃) → Noble Consort Qing (慶貴妃) → Imperial Noble Consort Qinggong (慶恭皇貴妃)

Noble Consort

 Noble Consort Xin (忻貴妃) of the Daigiya clan (戴佳氏) (26 June 1737 – 28 May 1764)Titles: Concubine Xin (忻嬪) → Consort Xin (忻妃) → Noble Consort Xin (忻貴妃)
 6th daughter (24 August 1755 – 27 September 1758)
 8th daughter (16 January 1758 – 17 June 1767)
 Obstructed labour or miscarriage at eight months (28 May 1764)
Noble Consort Yu (愉貴妃) of the Keliyete clan (珂里葉特氏) (15 June 1714 – 9 July 1792)Titles: Mistress (格格) → First Attendant Hai (海常在) → Noble Lady Hai (海貴人) → Concubine Yu (愉嬪) → Consort Yu (愉妃) → Noble Consort Yu (愉貴妃)
 Yongqi, Prince Rongchun of the First Rank (榮純親王 永琪; 23 March 1741 – 16 April 1766), 5th son
Noble Consort Xun (循貴妃) of the Irgen-Gioro clan (伊爾根覺羅氏) (29 October 1758 – 10 January 1798)Titles: Concubine Xun (循嬪) → Consort Xun (循妃) → Dowager Consort Xun (循太妃) → Noble Consort Xun (循貴妃)
 Noble Consort Ying (穎貴妃) of the Baarin clan (巴林氏) (7 March 1731 – 14 March 1800)Titles: Noble Lady (貴人) → First Attendant Na (那常在) → Noble Lady Na (那貴人) → Concubine Ying (穎嬪) → Consort Ying (穎妃) → Dowager Noble Consort Ying (穎貴太妃)
 Noble Consort Wan (婉貴妃) of the Chen clan (陳氏) (1 February 1717 – 10 March 1807)Titles: Mistress (格格) → First Attendant (常在) → Noble Lady (貴人) → Concubine Wan (婉嬪) → Consort Wan (婉妃) → Dowager Noble Consort Wan (婉貴太妃)

Consort

Consort Shu (舒妃) of the Yehe-Nara clan (葉赫那拉氏) (7 July 1728 – 4 July 1777)Titles: Noble Lady (貴人) → Concubine Shu (舒嬪) → Consort Shu (舒妃)
 Yongyue (永玥;12 June 1751 – 7 July 1753), 10th son. 
 Consort Yu (豫妃) of the Oirat Borjigin clan (博爾濟吉特氏) (12 February 1730 – 31 January 31, 1774)Titles: Noble Lady Duo (多貴人) → Concubine Yu (豫嬪) → Consort Yu (豫妃)
 Miscarriage (1759 or 1760)
 Consort Rong (容妃) of the Hezhuo clan (和卓氏) (10 October 1734 – 24 May 1788)Titles: Noble Lady He (和貴人) → Concubine Rong (容嬪) → Consort Rong (容妃)
 Consort Dun (惇妃) of the Wang clan (汪氏) (27 March 1746 – 6 March 1806)Titles: First Attendant Yong (永常在) → Noble Lady Yong (永貴人) → First Attendant Yong (永常在) → Noble Lady Yong (永貴人) → Concubine Dun (惇嬪) → Consort Dun (惇妃) → Concubine Dun (惇嬪) → Consort Dun (惇妃) → Dowager Consort Dun (惇太妃)
 Princess Hexiao of the First Rank (固倫和孝公主; 2 February 1775 – 13 October 1823), 10th daughter
Married Fengšeninde (丰紳殷德; 1775–1810) of the Manchu Niohuru clan on 12 January 1790, and had issue (one son).
 Miscarriage (1777 or 1778)
 Consort Fang (芳妃) of the Chen clan (陳氏) (d. 20 September 1801)Titles: First Attendant Ming (明常在) → Noble Lady Ming (明貴人) → First Attendant Ming (明常在) → Noble Lady Ming (明貴人) → Concubine Fang (芳嬪) → Consort Fang (芳妃) → Dowager Consort Fang (芳太妃)
 Consort Jin (晉妃) of the Fuca clan (富察氏) (d. 1822)Titles: Noble Lady Jin (晉貴人) → Dowager Consort Jin (晉太妃)

Concubine

 Concubine Yi (儀嬪) of the Huang clan (黄氏) (d. 1 November 1736)<br/ >Titles: Mistress (格格) → Concubine (嬪) → Concubine Yi (儀嬪)
 Concubine Yi (怡嬪) of the Bo clan (柏氏) (1 May 1721 – 30 June 30, 1757)<br/ >Titles: Noble Lady (貴人) → Concubine (嬪) → Concubine Yi (怡嬪)
 Concubine Shen (慎嬪) of the Bai'ergesi clan (拜爾葛斯氏) (d. 1765)<br/ >Titles: Noble Lady Yi (伊貴人) → Concubine Shen (慎嬪)
 Concubine Xun (恂嬪) of the Huoshuote clan (霍碩特氏) (d. 1761)<br/ >Titles: First Attendant Guo (郭常在) → Noble Lady Guo (郭贵人) → Concubine Guo (郭嬪) → Concubine Xun (恂嬪)
 Concubine Cheng (誠嬪) of the Niohuru clan (鈕祜祿氏) (d. 29 May 1784)<br/ >Titles: Noble Lady Lan (兰贵人) → First Attendant Lan (兰常在) → Noble Lady Lan (兰贵人) → Concubine Cheng (誠嬪)
 Concubine Gong (恭嬪) of the Lin clan (林氏) (1733–1805)<br/ >Titles: First Attendant (常在) → Noble Lady (貴人) → First Attendant (常在) → Noble Lady (貴人) → Concubine Gong (恭嬪)

Noble Lady

 Noble Lady Shun (順貴人) of the Niohuru clan (鈕祜祿氏) (3 January 1748 – 1790)<br/ >Titles: Noble Lady Chang (常貴人) → Concubine Shun (順嬪) → Consort Shun (順妃) → Concubine Shun (順妃) → Noble Lady Shun (順貴人)
 Miscarriage (1776)
 Noble Lady E (鄂貴人) of the Sirin-Gioro clan (西林覺羅氏) (d. 1808)<br/ >Titles: First Attendant E (鄂常在) → Noble Lady E (鄂貴人)
 Noble Lady Rui (瑞貴人) of the Socoro clan (索綽絡氏) (d. 26 June 1765)<br/ >Titles: First Attendant Rui (瑞常在) → Noble Lady Rui (瑞貴人)
 Noble Lady Bai (白貴人) of the Bo clan (柏氏) (17 June 1730 – 26 May 1803)<br/ >Titles: First Attendant Bai (白常在) → Noble Lady Bai (白貴人)
 Noble Lady Lu (祿貴人) of the Lu clan (陸氏) (d. 1788)<br/ >Titles: First Attendant Lu (祿常在) → Noble Lady Lu (祿貴人) → First Attendant Lu (祿常在) → Noble Lady Lu (祿貴人)
 Noble Lady Shou (壽貴人) of the Bo clan (柏氏) (d. 1809)<br/ >Titles: First Attendant Chong (充常在) → Noble Lady Shou (壽貴人)
 Noble Lady Xiu (秀貴人) (d. 1745)
 Noble Lady Shen (慎貴人) (d. 9 September 1777)
 Noble Lady (贵人) of the Wu clan (武氏) (d. 1781)<br/ >Titles: First Attendant Wu (常在) → Noble Lady Wu (贵人)
 Noble Lady Jin (金貴人) (d. 1778)Titles: First Attendant Jin (金常在) → Noble Lady Jin (金貴人)
 Noble Lady Xin (新貴人) (d. 1775)Titles: First Attendant Xin (新常在) → Noble Lady Xin (新貴人)
 Noble Lady Fu (福貴人) (d. 1764) Titles: First Attendant Fu (福常在) → Noble Lady Fu (福貴人)

First Attendant

 First Attendant Kui (揆常在) (d. 26 May 1756)
 First Attendant Yu (裕常在) of the Zhang clan (张氏) (d. 1745)Titles: First Attendant (常在) → First Attendant Yu (裕常在)
 First Attendant Ping (平常在) (d. 1778)
 First Attendant Ning (寧常在) (d. 1781)

Second Attendant

 Second Attendant Xiang (祥答应) (d. 28 March 1773)Titles: Noble Lady Xiang (祥貴人) → First Attendant Xiang (祥常在) → Noble Lady Xiang (祥貴人) → Second Attendant Xiang (祥答应)
 Second Attendant Na (那答應)Titles: First Attendant Na (那常在) → Second Attendant Na (那答應)
 Second Attendant Wan (莞答應)
 Second Attendant Cai (采答應)
 Second Attendant (答應)<br/ >Titles: Lady-in-waiting (官女子) → Second Attendant (答應)

Mistress

 Mistress (格格) (d. October 1729)
 Mistress (格格) (d. 30 July 1731)

Lady-in-waiting

 Lady-in-waiting (官女子)

Ancestry

In popular culture
 Portrayed by Tony Liu in The Adventures Of Emperor Chien Lung (1977).
 Portrayed by Zhang Tielin in My Fair Princess (1998).
 Portrayed by Kwong Wa in Happy Ever After (1999).
 Portrayed by Nie Yuan in World granary (2001), Story of Yanxi Palace (2018) and Yanxi Palace: Princess Adventures (2019).
 Portrayed by Ti Lung in My Fair Princess III (2003).
 Portrayed by Chiu Hsinchih in New My Fair Princess (2011).
 Portrayed by Wang Wenjie in Empresses in the Palace (2011).
 Portrayed by Chen Xu in Palace II (2012).
 Portrayed by Kent Tong in Palace 3: The Lost Daughter (2014).
 Portrayed by Zhang Guoqiang in Succession War (2018).
 Portrayed by Wallace Huo in Ruyi's Royal Love in the Palace (2018).

Works by the Qianlong Emperor
 

 See also 

 Jean Joseph Marie Amiot
 Canton System
 Family tree of Chinese monarchs (late)
 Long Corridor
 Manwen Laodang Putuo Zongcheng Temple
 Qianlong Dynasty
 Qianlong Tongbao
 Portuguese Macau
 Military of Macau under Portuguese rule
 British Hong Kong
 British Forces Overseas Hong Kong
 Mao Zedong's cult of personality

Notes

References
Citations

Sources

 

 
 

 

 
 
 
 

 
 

 
 

 
 

 

 
 

 
 
 Robbins, Helen Henrietta Macartney (1908). Our First Ambassador to China: An Account of the Life of George, Earl of Macartney with Extracts from His Letters, and the Narrative of His Experiences in China, as Told by Himself, 1737–1806, from Hitherto Unpublished Correspondence and Documents. London : John Murray. [digitized by University of Hong Kong Libraries, Digital Initiatives, "China Through Western Eyes."

 van Braam Houckgeest, Andreas Everardus. (1797). Voyage de l'ambassade de la Compagnie des Indes Orientales hollandaises vers l'empereur de la Chine, dans les années 1794 et 1795.'' Philadelphia: M.L.E. Moreau de Saint-Méry.
 Van Braam Houckgeest, Andreas Everardus. (1798). An authentic account of the embassy of the Dutch East-India company, to the court of the emperor of China, in the years 1974 and 1795, Vol. I. London : R. Phillips. [digitized by University of Hong Kong Libraries, Digital Initiatives, "China Through Western Eyes."

Further reading

 (alk. paper)

External links 

 

 
1711 births
1799 deaths
18th-century Chinese monarchs
Monarchs who abdicated
Qing dynasty emperors
Yongzheng Emperor's sons
Genocide perpetrators
Anti-Christian sentiment in Asia
Qing dynasty Buddhists
Chinese Buddhist monarchs